Pedetontus is a genus of jumping bristletails in the family Machilidae. There are about 10 described species in Pedetontus.

Species
 Pedetontus calcaratus (Silvestri, 1911)
 Pedetontus californicus (Silvestri, 1911)
 Pedetontus gershneri Allen, 1995
 Pedetontus palaearcticus Silvestri, 1925
 Pedetontus persquamosus (Silvestri, 1911)
 Pedetontus saltator Wygodzinsky & Schmidt, 1980 (jumping bristletail)
 Pedetontus schicki Sturm, 2001
 Pedetontus submutans (Silvestri, 1911)
 Pedetontus superior (Silvestri, 1911)
 Pedetontus yosemite Sturm, 2001

References

Further reading

 

insect genera